3-Hydroxybutanal (acetaldol) is an organic compound with the formula CH3CH(OH)CH2CHO. It is classified as an aldol, formally the product of the dimerization of acetaldehyde. A colorless liquid, it is a versatile and valuable intermediate with diverse impacts. The compound is chiral although this aspect is not often exploited.

Production
Acetaldehyde dimerizes upon treatment with aqueous sodium hydroxide:
2CH3CHO  →  CH3CH(OH)CH2CHO  +  H2O

Reactions and uses
Dehydration of 3-hydroxybutanal gives crotonaldehyde.  Distillation of 3-hydroxybutanal is sufficiently forcing to effect this conversion:
CH3CH(OH)CH2CHO  →  CH3CH=CHCHO  +  H2O
Hydrogenation of 3-hydroxybutanal gives 1,3-butanediol:
CH3CH(OH)CH2CHO  +  H2  →  CH3CH(OH)CH2CH2OH
This diol is a precursor to 1,3-butadiene, precursor to diverse polymers.

Polymerization of 3-hydroxybutanal is also spontaneous, but can be stopped with the addition of water.

Former or niche uses
It was formerly used in medicine as a hypnotic and sedative.

See also
 4-Hydroxybutanal

References

Hydroxy aldehydes
GABA analogues
Hypnotics
Sedatives
Aldols